Lawrence Michael DeFalco (August 25, 1915 – September 22, 1979) was an American prelate of the Roman Catholic Church. He served as Bishop of Amarillo from 1963 to 1979.

Biography
The eldest of nine children, Lawrence DeFalco was born in McKeesport, Pennsylvania, to Rosario and Margret (née Desmone) DeFalco. His father was originally from Atena Lucana, Italy and worked as a streetcar company foreman. He entered St. Vincent's College at Latrobe in 1933. However, he was forced to enter St. John's Home Mission Seminary at Little Rock, Arkansas, in 1935, because the Diocese of Pittsburgh to the Great Depression. He was ordained to the priesthood on June 11, 1942.

DeFalco then served as a curate at St. Patrick's Cathedral in Fort Worth, Texas, until 1952, when he became vice-chancellor of the Diocese of Dallas-Fort Worth. He briefly served as a curate at Sacred Heart Cathedral in Dallas before being sent in 1953 to study at the Pontifical Gregorian University in Rome, from where he obtained a Licentiate of Canon Law. Following his return to Dallas in 1955, he became secretary of the diocesan marriage tribunal. He served as the founding pastor of Our Lady of Perpetual Help in Dallas from 1956 to 1962. He was named a Papal Chamberlain in 1961, and rector of St. Patrick Cathedral at Fort Worth in 1962.

On April 16, 1963, DeFalco was appointed fifth Bishop of Amarillo by Pope John XXIII. He received his episcopal consecration on the following May 30 from Bishop Thomas Kiely Gorman, with Bishops Francis Joseph Green and Albert Lewis Fletcher serving as co-consecrators, at St. Patrick Cathedral. He was installed at Sacred Heart Cathedral on June 13, 1963. Between 1963 and 1965, he attended three sessions of the Second Vatican Council. During his 16-year-long tenure, he worked to implement the Council's reforms, establishing pastoral councils and senates of priests, of nuns, and of deacons. He also reduced diocesan debt, but was forced to close several schools and hospitals. St. Laurence Church in Amarillo replaced Sacred Heart as the diocesan cathedral in 1975.

After being diagnosed with pancreatic cancer, DeFalco resigned as Bishop of Amarillo on August 28, 1979. He died a month later at age 64. He is buried at Llano Cemetery in Amarillo.

References

1915 births
1979 deaths
People from McKeesport, Pennsylvania
American people of Italian descent
Saint Vincent College alumni
Participants in the Second Vatican Council
20th-century Roman Catholic bishops in the United States
Roman Catholic bishops of Amarillo
Deaths from cancer in Texas
Deaths from pancreatic cancer
Catholics from Pennsylvania